Dicrodon is a genus of lizards in the family Teiidae. Commonly known as desert tegus, there are three described species.

Geographic range
Desert tegus are found in South America, specifically in Peru and Ecuador.

Description
Desert tegus are the smallest species of tegu.

Species
The following species, listed alphabetically by specific name, are recognized as being valid.

Nota bene: A binomial authority in parentheses indicates that the species was originally described in a genus other than Dicrodon.

Etymology
The specific name, holmbergi, is honor of American anthropologist Allan R. Holmberg (1909–1966), who collected the holotype in 1947 during his ethnological investigations in Peru.

References

Further reading
Duméril AMC, Bibron G (1839). Erpétologie générale ou Histoire naturelle complète des Reptiles. Tome cinquième [Volume 5]. Paris: Roret. viii + 854 pp. (Dicrodon, new genus, pp. 137–138; D. guttulatum, new species, pp. 138–140). (in French).

 
Lizard genera
Taxa named by Gabriel Bibron
Taxa named by André Marie Constant Duméril